Óscar Daniel Arroyo Peña (born 28 January 1990) is a Salvadoran professional footballer who plays as a goalkeeper for Primera División de El Salvador club Isidro Metapán. He is a former El Salvador international.

International career 
Arroyo was selected with El Salvador for the 2015 and 2017 CONCACAF Gold Cups. He made five appearances for the team in 2016.

Honours 
Alianza

 Primera División de Fútbol de El Salvador: Apertura 2015, Apertura 2017, Clausura 2018, Apertura 2019

References

External links 

 
 

1990 births
Living people
Sportspeople from Santa Ana, El Salvador
Salvadoran footballers
Association football goalkeepers
San Salvador F.C. footballers
C.D. FAS footballers
Alianza F.C. footballers
C.D. Chalatenango footballers
A.D. Isidro Metapán footballers
Primera División de Fútbol Profesional players
El Salvador international footballers
2015 CONCACAF Gold Cup players
2017 CONCACAF Gold Cup players